An AIRMET, or Airmen's Meteorological Information, is a concise description of weather phenomena that are occurring or may occur (forecast) along an air route that may affect aircraft safety. Compared to SIGMETs, AIRMETs cover less severe weather: moderate turbulence and icing, sustained surface winds of 30 knots or more, or widespread restricted visibility.

Types 

AIRMETs are broadcast on the ATIS at ATC facilities, and are referred to as Weather Advisories.  AIRMETs are valid for six hours.  NOTE: The definition has changed and no longer says "light aircraft";  AIRMETs are intended for all aircraft.

There are three types of AIRMET, all identified by a phonetic letter: S (Sierra), T (Tango), and Z (Zulu).  Chapter 7. Safety of Flight

 AIRMET SIERRA (Mountain obscuration or IFR) ceilings less than 1000 feet and/or visibility less than 3 miles affecting over 50% of the area at one time; extensive mountain obscuration
AIRMET TANGO (Turbulence) moderate turbulence, sustained surface winds of 30 knots or greater, and/or non convective low−level wind shear.
AIRMET ZULU (Icing) Moderate icing and provides freezing level heights.

For an authority to issue an AIRMET, applicable conditions must be widespread.  "Widespread" means that the applicable area covers at least 3000 square miles.  Because conditions across the forecast period can move across the area, it is possible that only a small portion of the area is affected at any time.  AIRMETs are routinely issued for six-hour periods beginning at 0145Z during Daylight Saving Time and at 0245Z during Standard Time. AIRMETS are also amended as necessary due to changing weather conditions or issuance/cancellation of a SIGMET.

Dissemination And Structure 

Most AIRMET dissemination is done graphically now, but computer systems use a text-based AIRMET, which is identical in structure to a SIGMET, with the only difference being that the "SIGMET" identifier in the First Line is replaced by the three type identifiers listed above.

See also
SIGMET
PIREP

References

External links
 
 
 
 Graphical representation of AIRMETs can be found at: AWC - Aviation Weather Center.  Select the G-AIRMET checkbox for "Graphical AIRMET".

Aviation meteorology
Weather warnings and advisories
Aviation publications